The 1860 United States presidential election in New Hampshire took place on November 2, 1860, as part of the 1860 United States presidential election. Voters chose five electors of the Electoral College, who voted for president and vice president.

New Hampshire was won by Republican candidate Abraham Lincoln, who won the state by 17.64%.

Results

See also
 United States presidential elections in New Hampshire

References

1860 New Hampshire elections
1860
New Hampshire